The 770th Radar Squadron is an inactive United States Air Force unit. It was last assigned to the 20th Air Division, Aerospace Defense Command, stationed at Fort George G. Meade, Maryland. It was inactivated on 1 January 1980.

The unit was a General Surveillance Radar squadron providing for the air defense of the United States.

Lineage
 Constituted as the 770th Aircraft Warning and Control Squadron on 14 November 1950
 Activated on 27 November 1950
 Redesignated as the 770th Radar Squadron (SAGE) on 1 October 1958
 Redesignated as the 770th Radar Squadron on 1 February 1974
 Inactivated on 1 January 1980

Assignments
 503d Aircraft Control and Warning Group, 1 January 1951
 26th Air Division, 6 February 1952
 4710th Defense Wing, 16 February 1953
 4709th Air Defense Wing, 1 March 1956
 26th Air Division, 18 October 1956
 New York Air Defense Sector, 8 January 1957
 Washington Air Defense Sector, 1 October 1961
 33d Air Division, 1 April 1966
 20th Air Division, 19 November 1969 - 1 January 1980

Stations
 Palermo AFS, New Jersey, 1 January 1951
 Fort George G. Meade, Maryland, 1 October 1961 - 1 January 1980

References

 Cornett, Lloyd H. and Johnson, Mildred W., A Handbook of Aerospace Defense Organization  1946 - 1980,  Office of History, Aerospace Defense Center, Peterson AFB, CO (1980).
 Winkler, David F. & Webster, Julie L., Searching the Skies, The Legacy of the United States Cold War Defense Radar Program,  US Army Construction Engineering Research Laboratories, Champaign, IL (1997).

External links

Radar squadrons of the United States Air Force
Aerospace Defense Command units